This is a list of Estonian television related events from 1996.

Events
27 January - Maarja-Liis Ilus and Ivo Linna are selected to represent Estonia at the 1996 Eurovision Song Contest with their song "Kaelakee hääl". They are selected to be the second Estonian Eurovision entry during Eurolaul held at the Decolte Nightclub in Tallinn.

Debuts

Television shows

1990s
Õnne 13 (1993–present)

Ending this year

Births

Deaths
14 March – Sophie Sooäär (born 1914), actress
9 June – Salme Reek (born 1907), actress

See also
1996 in Estonia